Philodryas nattereri is a species of venomous snake, endemic to South America.

Description 
The average length of this snake is 80 cm, but it can grow to a maximum length of 134 cm. It is characterized by a medium body, a long, slender tail, a slightly prominent and obliquely truncated snout, and moderately large eyes with round pupils. Its coloring varies from brown to gray, giving it camouflage against ground foliage. It is a fast snake with terrestrial habits, although recent studies have shown that this species can use arboreal environments with high efficiency. It is active during the day and can be quite aggressive when threatened. P. nattereri is opisthoglyphous; due to this dentition, it has difficulty injecting venom into large prey.

Philodryas nattereri is endemic to South America, found in Paraguay and Brazil, where it inhabits open forests, fields and cerrado. It feeds on a wide variety of prey, including birds, mammals, lizards, amphibians, lizard eggs and even other snakes.

Venom 
The venom of P. nattereri is quite active. It can cause dermo necrosis, myonecrosis, and hemorrhagic activity, resulting in mast cell degranulation, muscle damage and inflammation. Studies with rats have shown that venom from this species is capable of causing bleeding in different organs and morphological alterations. The venom of this species appears to be as active as that of Philodryas olfersii, and has a protein content of 863.9 µg, which corresponds to 86.3% of the entire venom.

References 

Snakes of South America
Colubrids